Elise Juska is an American novelist, short story writer, and essayist. She is as an associate professor at the University of the Arts, where she received the 2014 Lindback Award for Distinguished Teaching.

Career and education 
Juska is a graduate of Bowdoin College and the graduate writing program at the University of New Hampshire. She is the author of five novels including The Blessings, released in 2014 by Grand Central Publishing. The book was selected for the Barnes & Noble Discover Great New Writers Series, the May 2014 LibraryReads list, and Entertainment Weekly's "Must List." The Philadelphia Inquirer named the novel one of the 10 Best Books of 2014, describing it as: "[A] bighearted novel... Juska's moving, multifaceted portrait of the Blessing family gleams like a jewel."

Juska's new novel, If We Had Known, was released in hardcover by Grand Central Publishing in April 2018. Inspired by the shooting at Virginia Tech, the story is about an English professor who, after a shooting at her local mall, realizes that the gunman was her former student and wrote an essay for her class offering clues to his violent nature she might have missed.

Juska's first three novels were published in paperback by Simon & Schuster:  Getting Over Jack Wagner (2003), The Hazards of Sleeping Alone (2004), and One for Sorrow, Two for Joy (2007).

Her short stories and essays have appeared in Ploughshares, The Gettysburg Review, The Missouri Review, The Millions, Good Housekeeping, The Hudson Review, Prairie Schooner, Harvard Review, and numerous other publications.

Awards and honors
She was the 2013 winner of the Alice Hoffman Prize for Fiction from Ploughshares and her short stories have been honored by the Best American Short Stories and Pushcart Prize: Best of the Small Presses series.

References 

Year of birth missing (living people)
Living people
American writers
Bowdoin College alumni
University of New Hampshire alumni
University of the Arts (Philadelphia) faculty